The list of Olympic men's ice hockey players for Latvia consists of 57 skaters and 6 goaltenders. Men's ice hockey tournaments have been staged at the Olympic Games since 1920 (it was introduced at the 1920 Summer Olympics, and was permanently added to the Winter Olympic Games in 1924). Latvia has participated in five tournaments: 1936, 2002, 2006, 2010, and 2014. From 1956 until 1992 Latvia also participated in the Olympics as part of the Soviet Union and the Unified Team (for 1992). Latvia has never won a medal in ice hockey, with their highest finish being eighth in 2014.  

Eleven players have played in three separate Olympics, while five players — Mārtiņš Cipulis, Georgijs Pujacs, Krišjānis Rēdlihs, Miķelis Rēdlihs, and Arvīds Reķis — have played in the most games, 14 each. Three players, Aleksandrs Ņiživijs, Lauris Dārziņš, and Vjačeslavs Fanduļs, have the most goals, with 4, while Ņiživijs has the most assists (8), and points (12) for Latvia. Two Latvian players, Helmuts Balderis and Artūrs Irbe, have been inducted into the International Ice Hockey Federation Hall of Fame, though Balderis only played for the Soviet Union at the Olympics.

Key

Goaltenders

Skaters

Notes

References

 
 
 
 
 
 
 
 

Latvia men's national ice hockey team
ice hockey
Latvia
Latvia